"Dreamscaperers" is the nineteenth episode of the first season in the animated series Gravity Falls. The episode is  the first of the two-part season finale, the second being "Gideon Rises". It was first broadcast on July 12, 2013, on the Disney Channel. It was written by series creator Alex Hirsch, alongside Matt Chapman and Tim McKeon, and directed by Joe Pitt and John Aoshima. It marks the first appearance of Bill Cipher.

The series follows twins Dipper and Mabel, who live with their grand uncle, Grunkle Stan in a tourist trap called the Mystery Shack in the fictional town of Gravity Falls, Oregon. In this episode, Stan's nemesis Gideon (Thurop Van Orman) tries burglary into the Mystery Shack to steal the deed of the property from the safe. However, he is stopped by Grunkle Stan and thrown out. Gideon then summons a demon called Bill Cipher (Hirsch) to help him. Gideon asks Bill to invade Stan's mind and steal the combination to the safe, which is vincindoria. Dipper Pines (Jason Ritter) with his sister Mabel (Kristen Schaal) and friend Soos also go into Stan's mind to stop Bill from finding out the combination.

This episode was watched by 2.7 million viewers on its premiere broadcast on the Disney Channel, and received generally positive reviews from television critics.

Plot
While discussing the past transgressions of Grunkle Stan's business rival Gideon Gleeful, the twins hear someone breaking into the Mystery Shack. They find Gideon in the next room trying to figure out the combination to Stan's safe with the intention to steal the deed inside it. They confront Gideon, who initially does not take Stan seriously, but ultimately flees when Stan hits him with a broom. After Gideon leaves, the Pines with Wendy and Soos, who are employees at the Mystery Shack, sit down to watch television. After Soos finds that there is a bat flying in the kitchen, Stan sends his nephew Dipper to take care of the issue, making Dipper think that his uncle dislikes him by forcing him to do the hardest chores.

Meanwhile, Gideon performs a ritual in the Gravity Falls woods to summon the evil powerful being, Bill Cipher. Bill agrees to invade Stan's mindscape for Gideon, after making sure that he also will help him on another unspecified project of his own. However, their plans are overheard by Mabel and Soos and they report the situation to Dipper. Dipper consults his cryptic Journal "3", one of three books found in Gravity Falls that hold the supernatural secrets of the region, and finds out the dangers and abilities of Bill. After catching Bill invading Stan's mind, Dipper, Mabel and Soos, through a ritual explained in the cryptic journal, follow Bill into Stan's mindscape.

They find Bill, who was apparently expecting them and says that they shouldn't enter Stan's memories with him. He also engages in various antics in which he pulls out of Mabel's mind the movie characters that she was thinking about (Xyler and Craz) that follow them until the end of the episode. The gang enters into a psychological version of the Mystery Shack in Stan's mind where all of his memories are kept. While they are searching to find the safe combination before Bill does, the dream demon manages to disguise himself as Soos and follow them. Dipper goes into the memories of Stan and finds out a memory of him talking to Soos about his own life as a weak child, thinking that he was actually talking about him. Dipper, angry at his uncle, is unwilling to assist the gang in saving him and leaves.

After Mabel finds the memory of the safe combination, Bill reveals himself, steals it and runs away as Mabel, Soos, Xyler and Craz head out to search for him. Meanwhile, Dipper accidentally revisits the same memory that he saw and understands that he made a mistake and that Stan was expressing his actual feelings toward Dipper, and after watching the rest of the memory, learns that Stan is only hard on him to prepare him to "face the world". Imaginary Stan tells him that you can do anything you can imagine when you are in the mindscape.

Mabel and Soos had already found Bill, who is torturing them by bringing their worst nightmares to life. Dipper quickly arrives with the news of being able to make dreams reality and demonstrates the ability to his sister via laser vision. Using their imagination abilities, they nearly defeat Bill, who decides to give up and leave Stan's mind. Within seconds of Dipper, Mabel and Soos returning from Stan's mind, they discover that Gideon broke in again and successfully stole the deed — this time, he simply used dynamite to force the safe open, without needing the lock combination. The episode ends with the demolition of the Mystery Shack.

Production

The episode "Dreamscaperers" was written by Timothy "Tim" McKeon and Matthew "Matt" Chapman under the story of series creator Alexander "Alex" Hirsch. Series developers Joe Pitt and John Aoshima directed the episode. John Aoshima and Matt Braly have worked with Hirsch on the show ever since the making of the unaired, unnamed pilot that was used to pitch the show.

In "Dreamscaperers" there was the first appearance of the series antagonist Bill Cipher, however images of him are shown throughout the season. During the scene where Bill is summoned he strikes out a number of images on his body, like John F. Kennedy, UFOs, the Aztec calendar stone, the Apollo Moon landing, Stonehenge, Giza pyramids, crop circles, etc. continuing the show's scoffing of conspiracy theories. The characters Xyler and Craz from the fictional movie "Dream Boys High" are based on 1980s cartoons and teen films produced in the United States.

The cast of the episode consisted of the standards Jason Ritter as Dipper Pines, Kristen Schaal as Mabel Pines, Alex Hirsch as Stan Pines, Soos, and the new character Bill Cipher, and Thurop Van Orman as Lil' Gideon. Additional voices include Linda Cardellini as Wendy, Greg Cipes as Craz, John Roberts as Xyler, Jennifer Coolidge as Lazy Susan, Grey DeLisle as Carla McCorkle, Kevin Michael Richardson as Sheriff Blubs, and Stephen Root as Bud Gleeful.

Reception
"Dreamscaperers" was released on July 12, 2013 and it gained 2.700 million viewers ranking it in second place in the United States for the day of airing, it received a 0.5 rating from 18–49 demographic audience.

Alasdair Wilkins from The A.V. Club, giving it a grade of A-, described the episode as "a joyous celebration of all that Gravity Falls has accomplished over these first 19 episodes". In the episode review Wilkins stated "the show has become sophisticated enough in its storytelling and its character work that it can more easily spotlight a character so delightfully silly". He states that Bill Cipher is the most memorable creation in the episode describing him as "the Eye of Providence wearing a top hat", also stating that "the writing and Alex Hirsch's voicework hit a fascinating balance with the character; Bill is capable of genuine rage when his plans don't work out, yet there's always the sense that he's just toying with the kids, allowing them to temporarily beat him because it amuses him". However, Wilkins criticized the episode for using "under-motivated stories", also for the efforts by the writing staff to give Mabel and Dipper an equal status in the show.

The episode won art director Ian Worrell an Outstanding Individual Achievement in Animation award at the 2014 Primetime Creative Arts Emmy Awards.

International airdates
 October 2, 2013: Switzerland
 November 25, 2013: Germany
 March 14, 2014: Austria

References

Gravity Falls episodes
2013 American television episodes
Television episodes about dreams
Television episodes about demons